Anisia is a genus of flies in the family Tachinidae.

Species
A. aberrans (Townsend, 1935) (Synonym: Santacruziopsis claripennis Thompson, 1968)
A. ciliata Wulp, 1890
A. cineraria Wulp, 1890
A. cinerea Brèthes, 1909
A. dampfi (Aldrich, 1927)
A. fatua Wulp, 1890
A. flaveola (Coquillett, 1897)
A. fumipennis (Thompson, 1968)
A. gilvipes (Coquillett, 1897)
A. inflexa Wulp, 1890
A. macroptera Wulp, 1890
A. media (Townsend, 1935)
A. optata (Reinhard, 1942)
A. palposa Wulp, 1890
A. peregrina Wulp, 1890
A. rubripes Wulp, 1890
A. ruficoxa Wulp, 1890
A. serotina (Reinhard, 1945)
A. striata (Aldrich, 1928)
A. vanderwulpi Townsend, 1892

The following species are unplaced in Eryciini:
A. infima Wulp, 1890
A. trifilata Wulp, 1890

The following species were moved to other genera:
A. aberrans Wulp, 1890: Moved to Vibrissina
A. accedens Wulp, 1890: Moved to Lydinolydella; synonym of L. rasilis
A. aegrota Wulp, 1890: Moved to Opsomeigenia
A. approximata Wulp, 1890: Moved to Houghia
A. candicans Wulp, 1890: Moved to Vibrissina
A. congerens Wulp, 1890: Moved to Eucelatoria; synonym of E. dissepta
A. conspersa Wulp, 1890: Moved to Myiopharus
A. fulvipennis Wulp, 1890: Moved to Pseudoredtenbacheria
A. gagatina Wulp, 1890: Moved to Italispidea
A. inepta Wulp, 1890: Moved to Eucelatoria
A. intrusa Wulp, 1890: Moved to Eucelatoria
A. misella Wulp, 1890: Moved to Ametadoria
A. morionella Wulp, 1890: Moved to Lydinolydella; synonym of L. rasilis
A. mucorea Wulp, 1890: Moved to Vibrissina
A. neglecta Wulp, 1890: Moved to Lixophaga
A. nigella Wulp, 1890: Moved to Eucelatoria
A. nigrithorax Wulp, 1890: Moved to Erythromelana
A. nigrocincta Wulp, 1890: Moved to Lixophaga
A. niveomarginata Wulp, 1890: Moved to Spathidexia
A. obscurifrons Wulp, 1890: Moved to Erythromelana
A. opaca Wulp, 1890: Moved to Lixophaga
A. ophthalmica Wulp, 1890: Moved to Thelairodoria
A. pallidipalpis Wulp, 1890: Moved to Angustia
A. pulicaria Wulp, 1890: Moved to Oxynops; synonym of O. anthracinus
A. pullata Wulp, 1890: Moved to Myiopharus; synonym of M. trifurca
A. remissa Wulp, 1890: Moved to Lixophaga
A. signata Wulp, 1890: Moved to Calodexia
A. similis Wulp, 1890: Moved to Lixophaga
A. stolida Wulp, 1890: Moved to Eucelatoria; synonym of E. inepta
A. umbrina Wulp, 1890: Moved to Lixophaga

References

Diptera of North America
Diptera of South America
Exoristinae
Tachinidae genera
Taxa named by Frederik Maurits van der Wulp